KUVN-DT (channel 23) is a television station licensed to Garland, Texas, United States, broadcasting the Spanish-language Univision network to the Dallas–Fort Worth metroplex. It is owned and operated by TelevisaUnivision alongside Irving-licensed UniMás owned-and-operated station KSTR-DT (channel 49). Both stations share studios on Bryan Street in downtown Dallas, while KUVN-DT's transmitter is located in Cedar Hill, Texas.

History

Prior history of UHF channel 23 in Dallas–Fort Worth
Channel 23 was originally allocated to Dallas proper. The UHF Television Co.—a coalition of local oilmen—had applied for channel 23 construction permits in Dallas and Houston; the permits were granted in 1953, but they were never built and would be deleted by the Federal Communications Commission (FCC) in 1955.

As an educational station

The Richardson Independent School District then signed on an educational television station on channel 23 on February 29, 1960, KRET-TV. It was the first television station in the United States to be owned by a school district (beating KERA-TV, which was founded by the Dallas Independent School District, by eight months). KRET only broadcast on weekdays during the school year for only two hours a day initially, before expanding to the entire school day. Costing only $75,000 to build, it operated out of Richardson Junior High School before moving to Richardson High School in 1963. KRET-TV ceased operations in May 1970 and, on August 31, was transitioned to the "TAGER" closed-circuit television system used for high school and college telecourses; the broadcast license was returned to the FCC.

KUVN-DT station history

The current television station licensed to channel 23 first signed on the air on September 25, 1986, as KIAB; it was founded by International American Broadcasting (owned by local ophthalmologist Dr. Elizabeth Vaughan and also known as I Am Broadcasting). The station, operating from studios on Marquis Street in Garland, primarily carried the Consumer Discount Network home shopping service. Houston-based CDN folded in December 1987.

I Am Broadcasting filed for bankruptcy protection in 1988, and Univision purchased the station from bankruptcy for $5.2 million. On August 8, the station switched to Univision programming as KUVN. It was the first time Univision—the former Spanish International Network had been available over-the-air in North Texas since it had been carried from 1981 to 1984 on KNBN-TV channel 33.

KUVN-CD
KUVN-CD's construction permit was originally owned by the American Christian Television System and was transferred to Bill Trammell in 1990. In 1994, the station's license was transferred to Rodriguez-Heftel-Texas; the deal was consummated on April 10, 1995. The license was transferred to KESS-TV License Corporation on May 16, 1996. The last transfer to date was (BALTTL-19960510IC) in 1996, in which it was sold to Univision. The station relocated its signal from UHF channel 31 to channel 47 in 2001. KUVN-LP was designated as a Class A low-power station and changed its call letters to KUVN-CA on March 1, 2002. A construction permit was issued by the FCC on August 4, 2008 to allow then-KUVN-CA to operate a digital signal on channel 47, with an effective radiated power of 190 watts. The station was licensed for digital operation on June 3, 2015, and changed its call sign to KUVN-CD. KUVN-CD is not a repeater or a translator, as a Class A station cannot act as merely a repeater or translator.

News operation
KUVN-DT broadcasts 12 hours of locally produced newscasts each week (with two hours each weekday and one hour each on Saturdays and Sundays). Following its acquisition by Univision, the network invested in a news department for the station and began producing nightly Spanish-language local newscasts in April 1989.

On April 11, 2011, KUVN began broadcasting Primera Edicion and Vive La Mañana on Telefutura affiliate KSTR (channel 49). Like its newscasts at different times, it is broadcast in 480i standard definition, within their old studio set. Sister station KXLN-DT in Houston also uses the same titles for their newscasts; Vive La Mañana features a different graphics and music package shared by both KUVN and KXLN. In 2011, a new set for KUVN's newscasts was introduced. In 2012, KUVN began broadcasting its local newscasts in high definition.

On March 27, 2015, Univision announced it will replace Univision 23's morning newscast and Univision 45's Vive La Mañana with a regionalized morning newscast called Noticias Texas Primera Edicion that will air on Univision's stations in Dallas, Houston, San Antonio, and Austin from 4 to 6 a.m., meaning that Univision 23's morning show would be cancelled; its last morning newscast was on March 27, 2015.  The station's morning news anchors got relocated to Houston where the new regionalized morning newscast will air and where it is based. The station will also have morning news briefs and local, live cut-ins during Despierta America and the regionalized newscast. The regionalized newscast debuted on April 6, 2015; until then, there were repeats of Noticiero Univision: Edicion Nocturna and entertainment programming.

Technical information

Subchannels
The stations' digital signals are multiplexed:

Analog-to-digital conversion
KUVN shut down its analog signal, over UHF channel 23, on June 12, 2009, as part of the federally mandated transition from analog to digital television. The station's digital signal relocated from its pre-transition UHF channel 24 to channel 23. Prior to the shutdown of its analog signal, KUVN presented live coverage from Times Square showing the countdown to the nationwide digital transition.

References

Univision network affiliates
Bounce TV affiliates
Ion Mystery affiliates
Laff (TV network) affiliates
Television channels and stations established in 1986
1986 establishments in Texas
KUVN-DT
Spanish-language television stations in Texas